Munesh Sami was the touring keyboardist for Canadian metallers, Strapping Young Lad on all shows after the release of their eponymous album, Strapping Young Lad (2003).

The keyboard parts in SYL songs are minimal and are recorded in the studio for the albums by frontman Devin Townsend. On the self-titled Strapping Young Lad, keyboards were mainly performed by Will Campagne.

Sami did not return to SYL for their tour for "Alien" and after comments made by guitarist Jed Simon, it looks as if he will never return.

Keyboard parts on Alien were performed by Dave Young.

References

Canadian keyboardists
Living people
Assjack members
Year of birth missing (living people)